Laksam Pilot Government High School is a secondary school situated at Laksam, Comilla District, Bangladesh. It is situated at New Road in the Laksam municipality.

History 
Laksam Government Pilot High School (formerly Atul High School) was built in 1923 on the initiative of the then headmaster Babu Gurmannath Mitra and the three worthy sons of the then influential zamindar mother Yashodha Rani Chowdhurani, Atul Krishna Roy Chowdhury, Nabin Krishna Roy Chowdhury and Chandra Kumar Roy Chowdhury. Since its inception, the school has created a stir at various levels across the Comilla region with the help of competent management council, zamindar family, with the help of parents and with the dedicated efforts of experienced teachers.

Campus 
The school is located in the heart of Laksam Upazila of Comilla District, it is situated at New Road, near Laksam Bazar and Laksam Bypass.

Academics 
Admission to the 6th grade is by lottery.

Students take two board exams, the Junior School Certificate (JSC) and the Secondary School Certificate (SSC). Both are conducted by the Board of Intermediate and Secondary Education, Comilla.

In the 2018 JSC examination, 100% of students passed.

See also 
 Laksam Nawab Faizunnesa Government College
 Laksam Nawab Faizunnesa and Badrunnesa Amalgamated High School
 Laksam Al Amin Institute
 Laksam Nawab Bari

References 

1923 establishments in India
Schools in Comilla District
High schools in Bangladesh